Cerithium atratum is a species of sea snail, a marine gastropod mollusk in the family Cerithiidae.

Distribution
The distribution of Cerithium atratum includes the Western Atlantic.
 Brazil
 Belize

Description 
The maximum recorded shell length is 50 mm.

Habitat 
The minimum recorded depth for this species is 0 m; the maximum recorded depth is 91 m.

References

External links

Cerithiidae
Gastropods described in 1778